Iron Man: Armored Adventures (also known in early promotional materials as Iron Man: The Animated Series) is a 3D CGI-animated series based on the Marvel Comics superhero Iron Man. It debuted in the United States on Nicktoons on April 24, 2009, and it aired on Teletoon in Canada. The series is story edited by showrunner Christopher Yost, who also worked on Wolverine and the X-Men, and numerous other Marvel Animation projects. The television show is not related to the 2007 animated film The Invincible Iron Man; it has a different voice cast, but some story elements are similar and the show uses the same musical score as the film in some instances. It is the first Iron Man television series since Iron Man from 1994 to 1996, and started airing after the success of the live action Iron Man film.

The series follows the adventures of a younger version of Tony Stark and his alter ego of Iron Man. As Iron Man, he uses his technological inventions to fight other similarly technologically advanced threats. His friends James "Rhodey" Rhodes and Pepper Potts help him on his courageous and dangerous adventures.

The second season of this series premiered on July 13, 2011, running concurrently with the English dub of the completely separate Marvel Anime: Iron Man anime series, which had already finished airing on Japan's Animax in 2010.

On August 25, 2012, it was revealed that Iron Man: Armored Adventures would air as part of The CW's new Saturday morning children's block Vortexx. After November 24, 2012, Vortexx ceased airing the show and replaced it with Transformers: Prime on December 8, 2012.

As of January 2021, both seasons of the show are available on Disney+.

Synopsis

After a plane crash in which his industrialist father Howard Stark disappears after refusing to weaponize the Earth Mover at Obadiah Stane's behest, 16-year-old genius Tony uses a high-tech suit of armor he has constructed and investigates a charge that Stane may have been involved in his father's death. As Iron Man, Tony spends his time stopping Stane's plans and saving the world from other villains such as Mandarin, Mr. Fix, Whiplash, A.I.M., Living Laser, the Maggia, Controller, Crimson Dynamo, Blizzard, Killer Shrike, Unicorn, M.O.D.O.K., Ghost, Black Knight, and Technovore. He is assisted in his crime fighting efforts by James Rhodes and Pepper Potts. Tony's activities as Iron Man usually result in his needing to make up excuses as to why he is constantly late or missing from school and other activities. Dependent on his phenomenal technology for survival, Tony must balance the pressures of teenage life with the duties of being a superhero.

First season
The first season of Iron Man: Armored Adventures has a total of 26 episodes. Tony Stark, James "Rhodey" Rhodes, Pepper Potts, Gene Khan, Happy Hogan, Whitney Stane, Black Panther, The Hulk, and S.H.I.E.L.D. all appear in this season.

The first season focuses on the Makluan Rings saga as Tony Stark, Pepper, James Rhodes, and Gene Khan work together to get the 5 rings. Upon overthrowing his stepfather Xin Zhang, Gene secretly works undercover to steal the rings from his friends, and ends up betraying them (which upsets Pepper). The season also features the Madame Masque Saga, which comes to a conclusion in the episode "Best Served Cold". Tony's feud with Obadiah Stane comes to a partial conclusion in that episode as well. The season ends with two primary cliffhangers in the episode "Tales of Suspense". The now-friendless Gene discovers that the original Mandarin had 5 other rings besides the original 5. Tony finds out that his father, Howard, survived the plane crash and is being held prisoner, while the armory is destroyed during Xin Zhang's attack limiting Tony's resources to find and rescue his father.

This season featured Makluan Guardian versions of Dreadknight, Ultimo, Firebrand, and Fin Fang Foom who guard the rings the Mandarin hasn't obtained yet.

Black Panther, Hulk, Rick Jones, Nick Fury, and S.H.I.E.L.D. make guest appearances.

Second season
The second season of Iron Man: Armored Adventures has a total of 26 episodes, just like the first season. Black Widow / Natasha Romanoff, Hawkeye, Doctor Doom, Magneto and Justin Hammer appear in this season. General Nick Fury, Black Panther, Mr. Fix, Whiplash and Obadiah Stane return.

The second season covers the Armor Wars saga and Stane International storylines. The first half of Season 2 reflecting the Armor Wars has Tony and Rhodey as his definite partner War Machine fighting many people who have stolen Stark's armor tech and seek to exploit the stolen Iron Man specs for their own purposes. The enemies young Stark fights during this version of the Armor Wars include the Ghost who steals Iron Man specs and knows that Tony Stark is Iron Man. Ghost sells the specs to both Justin Hammer and Obadiah Stane but says he will not reveal Iron Man's true identity until Tony turns 18. Justin Hammer makes an armor with the Iron Man specs with the armor being called Titanium Man. Doctor Doom joins forces with Stane to attain the Iron Man armor operating system.  Stane builds the Iron Monger armor which is revealed actually to be a direct upgrade from Crimson Dynamo armor (version 3) and is much larger than in the comic book and live action movie realities. The Armor Wars conclude as Obadiah Stane discovers the identity of Iron Man. Stane steals Iron Monger and is intent on destroying Tony once and for all.

While Tony is fighting the Armor Wars, Howard Stark is shown to be alive and forced by Gene to find the other 5 Makluan Rings. Gene continues to find and secured the sixth, seventh, eighth, and ninth rings for himself during this time. This part of the season also included Makluan Guardian versions of Melter, Sunturion, Grim Reaper, and Grey Gargoyle who guard the remaining Makluan Rings.

The second half of season 2 showcases the printed page storyline of loosely based on the "Stane International" story arc. Justin Hammer (instead of Obadiah Stane) successfully buys control of Stark International. Stark, Rhodey and Potts all agree to fight against Hammer and his weaponization of Stark International's projects. Unlike the printed page version, Stark and Rhodes reject the title of Circuits Maximus for the new start-up and settle on "Stark Solutions" (opposite to Stark Enterprises of the printed page).

By the end of the second season, Pepper has assumed the armored identity of Rescue.

On March 25, 2013, Marvel Animation announced April 23, 2013, the release of the "Complete Season 2" 4-DVD box set.

Episodes

Main cast
 Adrian Petriw as Anthony "Tony" Stark / Iron Man
  Daniel Bacon  as James Rupert "Rhodey" Rhodes / War Machine
 Vincent Tong as Gene Khan, Xin Zhang / Mandarin
 Anna Cummer as Patricia "Pepper" Potts / Rescue
 Mackenzie Gray as Obadiah Stane / Iron Monger

Supporting cast
 Alistair Abell as Happy Hogan, Black Knight
 Michael Adamthwaite as Justin Hammer / Titanium Man, J.A.R.V.I.S.
 Ashleigh Ball as Natasha Romanoff / Black Widow
 Eric Bauza as Thunderbolt Ross
 Lisa Ann Beley as Iron Man Onboard Computer, Abigail Brand
 Jeffrey Bowyer-Chapman as Black Panther
 Christopher Britton as Doctor Doom
 Louis Chirillo as Arthur Parks / Living Laser
 Michael Daingerfield as Unicorn
 Michael Dobson as Ghost, Makluan Warrior
 Brian Drummond as O'Brian, Makluan Warrior
 Mark Gibbon as Hulk
 Andrew Francis as Rick Jones, Hawkeye
 Catherine Haggquist as Roberta Rhodes
 Ron Halder as Professor Abraham Klein, Magneto, Professor X
  Fred Henderson as Howard Stark
 Peter Kelamis as Whiplash
 Michael Kopsa as Dr. Basil Sandhurst / Controller
 Paula Lindberg as Sasha
 Donny Lucas as Mr. Fix
 Kristie Marsden as Whitney Stane / Madame Masque
 Richard Newman as Dr. Anton Harkov
 Brenna O'Brien as Rhona Burchill / Mad Thinker
  Mark Oliver  as Ivan Vanko / Crimson Dynamo
 David Orth as Donnie Gill / Blizzard
 Ty Olsson as Killer Shrike
 Dean Redman as Nick Fury
 Russell Roberts as Count Nefaria
 Tabitha St. Germain as Maria Hill, Technovore
 Venus Terzo as Jean Grey
 French Tickner as Professor Zimmer
 Lee Tockar as MODOK
 Dale Wilson as Senator Robert Kelly
 Alex Zahara as Peter Corbeau

Production

Pre-release
Months before the show's television debut, Marvel had a screening of the first episode of the series at the San Diego Comic-Con. There was also a room where the public could meet, and talk with the Co-Producer Josh Fine and Head Writer Chris Yost among others involved in the production of the show. The trailer of the show was also released on Marvel's official website as well as numerous behind-the-scene and teaser trailers on the website in the weeks before the US television debut.

Theme song
Popular rock band Rooney recorded the theme song to the series. The song originally could be downloaded from Teletoon's website. A provided "secret code", Tony would be needed to access the theme. This "secret code" was shown onscreen during Canadian broadcasts of the first few episodes of the first season. The music video for the theme song features clips of Rooney singing, along with clips of Iron Man from the show.

Animation style
The series is made primarily using computer-generated imagery (CGI), in a similar style to MTV's Spider-Man: The New Animated Series and Nicktoons' original series Skyland. The technique is similar to cel-shading animation technique although the detail and resolution are lower.

DVD releases

The pilot episode was released as a bonus feature in Wal-Mart's edition of the live-action Iron Man movie.

Volume One was released on DVD in the United States on October 20, 2009. The Blu-ray edition was released exclusively through Best Buy. In the UK, Volume One contains the first 13 episodes (the one-hour pilot being split into two separate episodes) on two discs. Volume Two was released in the United States on January 5, 2010. The Complete Season One was released in the United States on May 4, 2010. The Complete Season One set included an unreleased pair of Volume Three and Four DVDs. The Complete First Season was released on Blu-ray in Australia.

Season Two, Volume One was released on DVD on June 26, 2012, with Volume Two released on September 25, 2012. The Season 2, Volume 3 DVD was released on January 22, 2013. Season 2 Volume 4 and the complete second season set became available April 23, 2013.

Reception
The hour-long premiere of Iron Man: Armored Adventures broke Nicktoons Network's record of highest-rated original series by premiering with over 125,000 viewers.

Reviews of the pilot episode have been mixed. Some praise the series for its detailed and layered writing, strong continuity, and character designs. Entertainment Weekly gave the series debut a B+ grade, saying, "What could've been a clunky retrograde reboot works surprisingly well, thanks to some smart writing and stellar CG butt-kickery."

Awards
In 2012, Iron Man: Armored Adventures won the Pulcinella Award for Best TV Series for Teens.

In 2013, it was included on TV Guide's list of the 60 greatest cartoons of all time.

References

External links

 DQ Entertainment page 
 Iron Man: Armored Adventures at Animated Superheroes
 The trailer for Iron Man: Armored Adventures at Marvel.com
 IGN - A Modern History of Iron Man
 
 

2000s American animated television series
2010s American animated television series
2000s American science fiction television series
2010s American science fiction television series
2009 American television series debuts
2012 American television series endings
2000s Canadian animated television series
2010s Canadian animated television series
2000s Canadian science fiction television series
2010s Canadian science fiction television series
2009 Canadian television series debuts
2012 Canadian television series endings
2000s French animated television series
2010s French animated television series
2009 French television series debuts
2012 French television series endings
American computer-animated television series
Canadian computer-animated television series
French computer-animated television series
Iron Man television series
Teen animated television series
Teen superhero television series
American children's animated action television series
American children's animated adventure television series
American children's animated science fantasy television series
American children's animated superhero television series
Canadian children's animated action television series
Canadian children's animated adventure television series
Canadian children's animated science fantasy television series
Canadian children's animated superhero television series
French children's animated action television series
French children's animated adventure television series
French children's animated science fantasy television series
French children's animated superhero television series
Luxembourgian animated television series
Anime-influenced Western animated television series
English-language television shows
Marvel Animation
Nicktoons (TV network) original programming
Animated television series based on Marvel Comics
Television shows based on Marvel Comics
Television series by Method Animation
France Télévisions children's television series